Phyllodes is a genus of moths in the family Erebidae. The genus was erected by Jean Baptiste Boisduval in 1832

Description
Tibia heavily spined. Antennae thickened and simple. Forewings narrower. Inner and outer margins quite evenly curved. Larva with four abdominal pairs.

Species
 Phyllodes consobrina Westwood, 1848
 Phyllodes conspicillator Cramer, [1777]
 Phyllodes eyndhovii Vollenhoven, 1858
 Phyllodes imperialis Druce, 1888
 Phyllodes staudingeri Semper, 1901
 Phyllodes verhuelli Vollenhoven, 1858

References

 
 

Calpinae
Moth genera